David Wright (born 1964) is an American writer.

Early life and education 
Wright grew up in Borger, Texas. He holds a BA from Carleton College and an MFA from the MFA Program for Poets & Writers at the University of Massachusetts Amherst.  He also studied at the École des Hautes Études en Sciences Sociales.  Before he started teaching creative writing, he was a player/coach on various American football teams in Paris and London.  He teaches at the University of Illinois at Urbana-Champaign.

He has also published under the name "David Wright Faladé", in honor of his biological father.

Works

Books
 Black Cloud Rising, Atlantic Monthly Press, February 2022.

Short stories
"The Sand Banks, 1861" (2020)

Documentary film
Rescue Men: The Story of the Pea Island Lifesavers (2010).

Television journalism

 "The Pea Island Story", co-written and co-produced with Stephanie Frederic and David Zoby. Aired on BET Tonight, February 1999.

Awards
 2017: International Board on Books for Young People, grades 9–12, Away Running
 2011: Fulbright U.S. Scholar Program, Universidade de São Paulo, Brazil.
 2009: North Carolina Humanities Council, Large Grant, for production of Rescue Men: The Story of the Pea Island Lifesavers.
 2005: Dobie-Paisano Fellowship, University of Texas and the Texas Institute of Letters.
 2004: Tennessee Williams Scholar, Sewanee Writers’ Conference.
 1999: National Endowment for the Humanities, Summer Institute for College and University Faculty Fellow, W. E. B. Du Bois Institute for Afro-American Research, Harvard University, "The Civil Rights Movement: History and Consequences".
 1997–1998: Chancellor’s Minority Postdoctoral Fellowship, Afro-American Studies and Research Program, University of Illinois at Urbana-Champaign.
 1994: Zora Neale Hurston/Richard Wright Award, the Zora Neale Hurston/Richard Wright Foundation, Fairfax, VA.
 1993: Paul Cuffe Memorial Fellowship, Munson Institute of American Maritime Studies, Mystic, Connecticut.

References

External links

African-American novelists
University of Illinois Urbana-Champaign faculty
Harvard Fellows
1964 births
Living people
University of Massachusetts Amherst MFA Program for Poets & Writers alumni
Carleton College alumni
Frank C. Munson Institute of American Maritime History alumni
People from Borger, Texas
21st-century American novelists
21st-century African-American writers
20th-century African-American people
Fulbright alumni